Illuminati is a computer-moderated play-by-mail game published by Flying Buffalo Inc. It is based on the Illuminati card game by Steve Jackson Games. It was originally owned by Adventure Systems but transitioned to Flying Buffalo Inc in 1986. The game's central focus is on conspiracy and intrigue and involved 24 players playing either by email or by mail in turns processed simultaneously by computer. Illuminati has won the Origins Award for Best Play-By-Mail Game seven times, once in 1985 and six times in the 1990s, and was inducted into the Origins Hall of Fame in 1997.

Development
Draper Kauffman stated that "The strange thing about this game is that it didn't start out as Illuminati", but rather that he "began with the basic concept of a PBM game of world conflict carried out by spies and secret agents, saboteurs and assassins, propagandists and opinion makers, hot money and smuggled arms, popular movements and secret conspiracies."

Illuminati was computer moderated. It was originally owned by Adventure Systems and transitioned to Flying Buffalo Inc in 1986. Flying Buffalo initially ran the game so that turns were processed upon receipt, whereas play-by-mail games were normally processed on a specified date, simultaneously. This gave an advantage to play-by-email (PBEM) over play-by-mail (PBM) players, and after a break in game licensing, Flying Buffalo separated the player types into different games and processed turns simultaneously.

Adventure Systems published in the Jan–Feb 1985 issue of Paper Mayhem that there had been winners in the first five games, providing details of the games themselves. The publisher stated that the first four games were for playtesting and began in February 1985.

Gameplay

Illuminati was similar to the Steve Jackson card game of the same name in that players controlled one of various "Illuminated" groups and try to dominate the world. The game's central focus was conspiracy and intrigue.

24 players acted as secret organizations. The game had four phases. The first phase was the "grab" phase where players attempted to control game resources. Players began dropping from the game in this phase. The second phase was the consolidation phase where tensions escalated and diplomacy played a greater role. The third warfare phase was followed by the fourth endgame phase.

According to reviewer Jean Curley, the fundamentals were simple. Each Illuminated group can control up to 4 other groups, who can (in turn) control from 0 - 4 other groups. The number of groups each can control is determined by the power, influence, and personnel of the group. Each turn, the player is given income money for his group and may spend it as he decides: in attack, defense, or in building up a group. Attacks may be made in an attempt to add a group to your power structure, to remove it from another players structure, or to eliminate it from the game entirely.

Reception and legacy
Robert S. Cushman reviewed Illuminati PBM in Space Gamer No. 72, and stated that "For you card players, prepare to have your conspiracies expanded several-fold, and for you PBMers, get ready to enjoy a really novel game, with lots of amusing quirks." Jean Kurley reviewed Illuminati in the Jan–Feb 1985 issue of Paper Mayhem. Kurley stated that, "Overall, the game plays very well," noting one drawback in "trying to crossreference some of the material in the Question-and-Answer section". Curley added: "This is a game for thinkers and strategists, and for those who enjoy competition. If you like plotting, deception, and conspiracy, then I heartily endorse this game for you."

Illuminati has won the Origins Award a number of times: in 1985, 1990, 1991, 1992, 1993, 1994, and 1995. The game was added to the Origins Hall of Fame in 1997. In the early 1990s, Illuminati placed between 55 and 65 percent in the Paper Mayhem play-by-mail game ratings in which readers ranked games based on playability, design, and product understanding.

See also
 List of play-by-mail games

Notes and references

Notes

References

Bibliography

Further reading
 

Flying Buffalo games
Origins Award winners
Play-by-mail games
Works about the Illuminati